Ladislav Šosták (born 18 December 1992), is a Slovak professional footballer who plays for MFK Zemplín Michalovce as a defender.

Club career
Šosták made his professional Fortuna Liga debut for MFK Zemplín Michalovce against FC Spartak Trnava on 22 July 2017.

References

External links

Futbalnet profile 

1992 births
Living people
Slovak footballers
Association football defenders
Partizán Bardejov players
MFK Zemplín Michalovce players
Sportspeople from Košice